Biastes may refer to:
 Biastes (bee), a genus of bees in the family Apidae
 Biastes, a genus of birds in the family Thamnophilidae; synonym of Biatas
 Biastes, a genus of flies in the family Stratomyidae; synonym of Tinda